The 1983 Lisbon Open – Doubles was an event of the 1983 Lisbon Open men's tennis tournament held in Lisbon, Portugal from 4 April until 10 April 1983. The draw comprised 16 players and four of them were seeded. Fourth-seeded Carlos Kirmayr and Cássio Motta won the doubles title, defeating first-seeded Pavel Složil and Ferdi Taygan in the final, 7–5, 6–4.

Seeds

Draw

References

External links
 1983 Lisbon Open draw

Lisbon Open
Lisbon Open
Lisbon